Wijkia carlottae, or Carlott's wijkia moss, is a species of moss of the family Pylaisiadelphaceae and genus Wijkia. It is endemic to the Haida Gwaii archipelago in British Columbia, Canada. It occurs in a number of different habitats, but only 10 occurrences are known. It is possibly threatened by logging and it currently classified as vulnerable by NatureServe.

References

Endemic flora of Canada
Haida Gwaii
Hypnales
Bryophyta of North America